Holzbach is a river of Baden-Württemberg, Germany. It is a left tributary of the Soppenbach (a tributary of the Biberbach) in Andelfingen.

See also
List of rivers of Baden-Württemberg

Rivers of Baden-Württemberg
Rivers of Germany